McDonald is an unincorporated community in Sherman County, Oregon, United States. Its post office was established on the John Day River on March 15, 1902, and closed on October 14, 1922. The first postmaster was William G. McDonald.

References

Former populated places in Sherman County, Oregon
Unincorporated communities in Sherman County, Oregon
1904 establishments in Oregon
Populated places established in 1904
Unincorporated communities in Oregon